Besthorpe may refer to:
Besthorpe, Norfolk
Besthorpe, Nottinghamshire